Christophe Lagrange (born 24 October 1966) is a French former professional footballer who played as a forward.

References

1966 births
Living people
French footballers
CS Sedan Ardennes players
RC Lens players
Angers SCO players
Le Havre AC players
AS Saint-Étienne players
Association football forwards
Ligue 1 players
Ligue 2 players